The fifth round of the women's points race of the 2008–2009 UCI Track Cycling World Cup Classics took place in Copenhagen, Denmark on 14 February 2009. 38 athletes participated in the contest.

Ellen van Dijk won, after winning the individual pursuit World Cup race the day before, the final points race. Katie Colclough finished second and Shelley Olds third.

Competition format
A points race is a race in which all riders start together and the object is to earn points during sprints or to lap the bunch.

The tournament consisted of two qualifying heats of 10 km (40 laps). The top twelve cyclist of each heat advanced to the 20 km final (80 laps).

Schedule
Saturday 14 February
12:55-13:15 Qualifying, heat 1
13:15-13:35 Qualifying, heat 2
14:10-14:40 Final
15:05-15:10 Victory Ceremony

Schedule from Tissottiming.com

Results

Qualifying

Qualifying Heat 1

Results from Tissottiming.com.

Qualifying Heat 2

Results from Tissottiming.com.

Final

Results from Tissottiming.com.

World Cup Standings
Final standings after 5 of 5 2008–2009 World Cup races.

Results from Tissottiming.com.

See also
 2008–2009 UCI Track Cycling World Cup Classics – Round 5 – Women's individual pursuit
 2008–2009 UCI Track Cycling World Cup Classics – Round 5 – Women's team pursuit
 UCI Track Cycling World Cup Classics – Women's points race

References

2008–09 UCI Track Cycling World Cup Classics
2009 in Danish women's sport
UCI Track Cycling World Cup – Women's points race